Segamat (Jawi: سڬامت Chinese: 昔加末) is a town located in the Segamat District, Johor, Malaysia. It is 95 km travel distance via North–South Expressway from Johor Bahru to Yong Peng, and another 77 km from Federal Route 1.

Strategically situated between Kuala Lumpur and Johor Bahru, Segamat is a fast-growing agricultural oil palm and rubber district, famous for its durians, hence its recent slogan to attract tourists: Selamat Datang ke Segamat - Tanah Raja Buah-buahan (Malay: Welcome to Segamat - The Land of the King of Fruits). Several recreational sites sit nearby to the town, namely Mount Ledang, Air Panas Waterfall and Bekok Waterfall.

History

According to local historian, Hassan bin Muhammad, the area used to be known as Rantau Panjang. In around 1511, a Bendahara of Malacca, Bendahara Tepok and his troops were retreating to Johor after the fall of Malacca to the invading Portuguese forces led by Afonso de Albuquerque. The Bendahara and his troops stopped and rested by a river in the area and drank water from the river. After the drink, the Bendahara exclaimed, "Segar amat!" (Malay: "Very refreshing!"), and named the river Segar Amat, in which over time evolved into Segamat. The name Segamat was initially applied only to the river, whereas the settlement nearby was still called Rantau Panjang. The town assumed the river's name only at the turn of the 20th century.

Buyong Adil in his Sejarah Alam Melayu Penggal V (Natural History of Malay Chapter V) wrote that Segamat comprises one of the nine states of Negeri Sembilan. Martin Lister, the British Resident of Negeri Sembilan in 1895–1897 also mentioned that Segamat was one of the states that Negeri Sembilan, which was once ruled by Temenggong Abd Rahman and appointed Temenggong Konit to administer Segamat/Muar from 1801. By 1900, Segamat, along with Klang and Naning were seceded to neighbouring states by Negeri Sembilan. Of these three towns, Segamat was annexed by Johor.

By the end of the 19th century, the four original districts includes several minor subdistricts, for example the previous Muar District has 4 minor districts – Parit Jawa, Chohong, Lenga and Segamat. The first District Officer of Segamat Minor District was Encik Menthol bin Haji Ahmad. In 1933, the district of Segamat was formed after a major district boundary realignment was made by the government of Johor to split the original 4 districts (Muar, Batu Pahat, Johor Bahru and Sedili) into 8 districts (before the 2008 realignment which added the Kulai and Tangkak districts to form 10 districts in Johor).

After the formation of Segamat District, the government began to develop Segamat, mainly with agricultural activities to boost the economy of Segamat. This included the construction of the national railroad system passing the town of Segamat and also the construction of the main road known today as Federal Route 1.

In the 1970s, Tun Razak Highway was constructed to boost the economy of Segamat as an agricultural hub, to shorten the travelling time to Kuantan and to speed up the development progress of the poorly developed areas in southern Pahang.

The Johor branch campus of Universiti Teknologi MARA was constructed at Jementah in the end of the 1980s and started its operation in 1991. The construction of UiTM campus in Segamat district turned Segamat into another important educational hub in Johor besides Skudai, which houses Universiti Teknologi Malaysia.

In 1996, the Segamat Land Port was constructed to make Segamat an important transport hub like Nilai, Negeri Sembilan. By constructing the land port, manufacturers may just transport their goods to Segamat Land Port which then will be transported to the nearest sea ports such as Pasir Gudang by train. However, the plan did not materialise as planned; the space was subsequently rendered largely vacant as of latest February 2012.

In 1999, the second bridge of Segamat, funded mainly by private developers, was constructed to reduce congestion at the main bridge. The second bridge was included as a part of Segamat Inner Ring Road package consisting the road upgrade to 4-lane road at Jalan Pemuda, Jalan Hassan, Jalan Pee Kang Hai and Jalan Chia Chin Koon, which was completed in August 2005. The inner ring road package is useful to divert the traffic flow when the main roads at the town center are closed for special occasions and events such as National Day.

Segamat experienced floods during the 1950s, 1984 and recently on 18 December 2006. The one in 2006, which was caused by Typhoon Utor in the Philippines, was generally considered to be the worst flood to have happened in Segamat and Johor. There was a conspiracy theory that the 2006 flood was caused by improper release of water from the upstream Bekok Dam. In January 2011, severe flooding occurred in Segamat and other parts of upstate Johor and the neighbouring state of Malacca, with about 31,000 people evacuated and several deaths.

Government and politics
Segamat Municipal Council, formerly known as the Segamat Town Board from 1912 until 1951, Segamat Town Council from 1951 until 1976, the North Segamat District Council from 1 January 1977 until 29 November 2000 and the Segamat District Council ( from 30 November 2000 until 31 December 2017, is the local authority of Segamat town.

Townscape 

The town of Segamat is the fifth largest town in the state of Johor with about 80,000 residents. The town centre can be divided into two, where both neighbourhoods are separated by Segamat River:
 Bandar Atas (Uptown) - The original town centre of Segamat. The official site of Segamat town centre today is Dataran Segamat, or Segamat Square.
 Bandar Seberang (Crosstown) - Located at the other side across Segamat river. This neighbourhood is known as Bandar Seberang because of its location across Segamat river. This area houses most of the supermarkets and shopping centres in Segamat.

In addition to the town centre, the urban area of Segamat also covers some villages and towns namely Pekan Jabi, Bukit Siput, Segamat Baru and Bandar Putra Segamat, which makes up the overall population of Segamat urban area to 100,000 residents.

The cost of living in Segamat is relatively affordable. Accommodation is readily available at the housing areas in Segamat town. Shophouses, supermarkets, restaurants and hawker centres in the proximity offer various and inexpensive choices for shopping, chilling out and eating out. The shopping market Giant has also been constructed here.

Economy
Agriculture is the main contributor to Segamat's economy, contributing about 61.8% of the total employment in 1991. The second economic contributor is manufacturing sector, with 13.1% of total work force in 1995. This is followed by the government service sector, with 12.2% of total work force in the same year.

Commercial areas 
The only shopping complex was built and started opening since year 2012 in Segamat named OneSegamat Mall, which is located adjoining the bus & taxi terminal and adjacent to the railway station, thus enjoying great traffic flow of shoppers and commuters creating excellent business potentials and sales prospects. The complex has the only cinema in Segamat located in its first floor, an 8-screen cinema operated by Lotus Five Star with a capacity around 1,800 people.

In the same year, a popular shopping KIP MART was built at the Bandar Utama.

Shopping
U Sentral
Billion Shopping Centre
Billion Yayasan
Econsave Segamat
Segamat Sentral
Nirwana Supermarket
Nirwana Yayasan
Housemaker Complex
Arked Sri Genuang
Arked Mara
Cowboy

Transportation

Car
Segamat is well-linked by both federal and state road networks. Federal Route 1, the main north–south trunk road of Peninsular Malaysia, runs through the town centre of Segamat.

The national expressway North–South Expressway Southern Route does not serve Segamat; motorists using PLUS are however able to get to Segamat by leaving the PLUS expressway at Exit 235–Tangkak Interchange (from Kuala Lumpur), Exit 242–Yong Peng South Interchange and Exit 241–Yong Peng North Interchange (from Johor Bahru). From Exit 235, motorists can then use Federal Route 23 and head north towards Segamat. Federal Route 23 joins Segamat to Tangkak and terminates at Muar.

Meanwhile, motorists from the east coast especially Pahang, can access Segamat through Tun Razak Highway (Federal Route 12), which connects Segamat through Muadzam Shah to Gambang near Kuantan.

Besides, there are several main state roads in Segamat, namely:
  - Jalan Pogoh
  - Jalan Muar–Labis
  - Jalan Batu Enam
  - Jalan Bekok
  - Jalan Tasek Alai

Public transportation

Rail
Segamat town has one railway station offering KTM Intercity services. However since 2016, diesel trains on the Intercity service only go between Johor Bahru and Tumpat, Kelantan. Direct services to Segamat and the east coast are no longer possible from Kuala Lumpur and further north. Passengers are required to switch to the ETS service (electrified Intercity trains) at Gemas, Negeri Sembilan.

Other stations in the Segamat constituency include Batu Anam, not in active service since 2017.

Road
There are three main intercity bus lines that serve the Segamat:
 Yow Hoe (Gemas–Ayer Hitam)
 North-West Johor (Segamat–Muar)
 Kenderaan Bas MARA-DARA (Segamat–Muadzam Shah) using Federal Route 12

Notable people
 Yeo Bee Yin (Batu Anam), Minister of Energy, Technology, Science, Climate Change and Environment
 Lee Boon Chye
 Penny Tai

References

External links

 Segamat.com.my - Segamat Community Website
 YM Ungku Mohd. Zaman bin Tahir (1996). Segamat: Sejarah dan Mitosnya. Al-Kafilah Enterprise.
 Segamat District Council official website

Towns in Johor
Segamat District